Nathaniel Prime (January 30, 1768 – November 26, 1840) was a New York broker and banker.

Early life
Prime was born in Rowley, Massachusetts on January 30, 1768. He was the son of Joshua Prime and Bridget Hammond Prime.

In his early years, he was a coachman to a  Boston merchant and moved to New York in 1795.

Career
In 1796, Prime organized "Nathaniel Prime, Stock and Commission Broker" at 42 Wall Street.  He made great wealth buying and selling bank stocks. After opening his own private bank, he allowed customers to deposit money and then loaned it out.

In 1808, he  brought in Samuel Ward III as a partner and the firm was renamed Prime & Ward.  In 1816, Joseph Sands, Prime's brother-in-law, was made a partner and the firm became Prime, Ward & Sands.

In 1824, the firm was again reorganized as Prime, Ward, Sands & King when James Gore King became a partner upon his return from England.  King, a son of U.S. Senator Rufus King, had previously been affiliated with the firm of King & Gracie, founded in 1818 in Liverpool, England by King and his brother-in-law, Archibald Gracie Jr. (the son of Archibald Gracie).  In 1826, after Joseph died the firm became Prime, Ward & King.

Residence
In 1807, Prime purchased  the Nathaniel Prime Mansion in Hell Gate, New York near Yorkville, New York. The building stood on the block between First Avenue and York Avenue and 89th and 90th streets. John Frazee did a sculpture of Prime.

Personal life

On June 7, 1797, Prime was married to Cornelia Sands (1773–1852), the daughter of Comfort Sands (d. 1835), the celebrated merchant, banker and Continental Congressman, and Elizabeth (née Cornell) Sands. Together, they were the parents of:

 Cornelia Prime (1800–1874), who married Robert Ray (1794–1879), a brother-in-law of New York Gov. John Alsop King.
 Edward Prime (1801–1883), a banker with Prime, Ward & King who married Charlotte Wilkins Hoffman (1808–1892).
 Emily Prime (1804–1854), who married William Seton (1796–1868), a U.S. Navy captain and son of Elizabeth Ann Seton, in 1832.
 Frederick Prime (1807–1887), who married Lydia Hare (1815–1883), a daughter of Robert Hare.
 Matilda Prime (1810–1849), who married Gerard Holsman Coster (1808–1880) in 1831.
 Laura Prime (1812–1887), who married John Clarkson Jay (1808–1891), the son of Peter A. Jay and grandson of John Jay.

Prime committed suicide on November 26, 1840, by cutting his throat. William H. Aspinwall served on the coroner's jury, and Edgar Howland informed diarist George Templeton Strong that:

"Prime went to his room at two o'clock and appears to have taken up and read his prayer book, then went before the glass, cut his throat coolly and steadily from ear to ear, replaced the razor in its case, and then walked into the next room, and there fell. The jury found "insanity." He had been dyspeptic and nervous for some time; he was retired from active life and his mind, I suppose, preyed on itself for want of occupation ..."

He is buried at the cemetery of Saint Paul's Church National Historic Site in Mount Vernon, Westchester County, New York.

Descendants
Through his daughter Cornelia, he was the grandfather of Cornelia Ray (1829–1867), who married Gen. Schuyler Hamilton (1822–1903), a grandson of Alexander Hamilton; Robert Ray (1832–1860), and Nathalie Elizabeth Ray (1837–1912), who married Edmund Lincoln Baylies (1829–1869), the parents of Edmund L. Baylies Jr.

Through his daughter Emily, he was the grandfather of author, novelist and popular science writer William Seton III (1835–1905), Robert Seton (1839–1927), a monsignor in the Roman Catholic Church and titular archbishop of Heliopolis.

Through his son Edward, he was the grandfather of William Hoffman Prime (1837–1881), who married Annie Rhodes Gilbert in 1879; Mary Catherine Prime (b. 1841), who married James A. Scrimper in 1868; and Henry Prime (b. 1847).  William's children included Charlotte Hoffman Prime (1881–1969), who married William Massena Benjamin (1874–1928), the son of Samuel Nicholl Benjamin; and Charlotte Prime (b. 1838), who married Leonard J. Wyeth in 1858.

References

External links

1768 births
1840 deaths
People from Yorkville, Manhattan
People from Rowley, Massachusetts
American stockbrokers
American bankers
Businesspeople from New York City
Businesspeople from Massachusetts
18th-century American businesspeople
19th-century American businesspeople
American investment bankers
Suicides by sharp instrument in the United States
Suicides in New York (state)
1840s suicides